The 2016–17 BVIFA National Football League is the seventh season of the competition. The season began on 18 September 2016.

Islanders FC won the championship, making it their seventh British Virgin Islands title. Islanders along with the top four sides qualified for the 2017 BVIFA President's Cup, a postseason tournament to determine the domestic cup champion.

Table

References 

BVIFA National Football League seasons
British Virgin Islands
football
football